O Mulato is a novel written by the Brazilian writer Aluísio de Azevedo. It was first published in 1881 and represents the beginning of Brazilian Naturalism.
The story denounces the racial discrimination of the late nineteenth century society of the Brazilian state of Maranhão.

1881 Brazilian novels
Naturalist novels